Ornipholidotos gemina is a butterfly in the family Lycaenidae. It is found in Cameroon, the Central African Republic, the Democratic Republic of the Congo, Uganda and Tanzania. The habitat consists of forests.

Subspecies
 Ornipholidotos gemina gemina (Cameroon, Democratic Republic of the Congo)
 Ornipholidotos gemina fournierae Libert, 2005 (Central African Republic, Democratic Republic of the Congo, Uganda, Tanzania)

References

Butterflies described in 2000
Taxa named by Michel Libert
Ornipholidotos